The 1971 Italian Grand Prix was a Formula One motor race held at Monza on 5 September 1971. It was race 9 of 11 in both the 1971 World Championship of Drivers and the 1971 International Cup for Formula One Manufacturers.

This race featured the closest finish in Formula One history, as Peter Gethin beat Ronnie Peterson by 0.01 seconds. The top five were covered by just 0.61 seconds, with François Cevert finishing third, Mike Hailwood fourth and Howden Ganley fifth.

Race report 

The historical Monza National Autodrome, located just north of the northern Italian city of Milan, in 1971 became the fastest circuit used by Formula One after the Belgian Spa-Francorchamps circuit was removed from the calendar. However, this was the last year in which the circuit was used with this configuration: considering the enormous speed that the cars reached in this edition, two chicanes were introduced the following year in the two most dangerous curves of the track.

Emerson Fittipaldi drove a four-wheel drive Lotus 56B powered by a gas turbine, the only time he would race in a Formula One World Championship race in a car not powered by a Ford Cosworth DFV engine. Due to ongoing legal issues between Team Lotus and the Italian authorities following Jochen Rindt's death the previous year, the car was entered under the name "World Wide Racing". 

With the championship settled, this was an opportunity for new drivers to prove themselves. Chris Amon in the Matra proved an embarrassment to Ferrari by seizing pole at their home track with the fastest lap of all time in a Formula One championship race, lapping at 156 mph (252 km/h), with the BRMs on the second row, whilst champion Stewart was in 6th after suffering gearbox problems. Mike Hailwood was making his debut for Surtees—an inspired choice as he held both the Formula 5000 and motorbike lap records for Monza.
Clay Regazzoni's Ferrari thrilled the crowd by surging forward from the fourth row to lead from Jo Siffert and Stewart until lap 3, when Ronnie Peterson took the lead. On lap 7, Stewart took the lead. By lap 16, Stewart and Jacky Ickx retired with engine problems, followed two laps later by Clay Regazzoni. The race began to break into high-speed packs—the leading one containing Hailwood (leading on his debut), François Cevert, Peterson, Siffert, Howden Ganley, Chris Amon, Peter Gethin and Jackie Oliver. Gethin, Peterson, Cevert, Hailwood and Ganley (who fell back slightly) battled right down to the line and all finished within two-tenths of a second of each other.
Siffert dropped back after problems with a gearbox that would only select fourth gear. Tyrrell-Ford won their first Constructors' Championship with two races remaining.

Classification

Qualifying

Race

Championship standings after the race 

Drivers' Championship standings

Constructors' Championship standings

References

External links

Italian Grand Prix
Italian Grand Prix
Grand Prix
Italian Grand Prix